Mary Spio is a deep space engineer, tech innovator and entrepreneur. She is the CEO and founder of CEEK Virtual Reality.

Early life and education 
Spio was raised in Ghana. She had her secondary school education at Holy Child High School in Cape Coast. At the age of 16 years she moved to stay in Syracuse, New York in US. She attended Syracuse University, graduating with a Bachelor of Science degree in electrical engineering in 1998. She later pursued a master's degree in electrical engineering and computer science from Georgia Institute of Technology.

Career 
Spio served in the U.S. Air force for 6 years as a wideband and satellite communications technician. After her service in the air force she moved to work with a at a satellite communications firm and had the opportunity of designing and launching satellites into deep space on a NASA project. She subsequently became the head of satellite communication systems for The Boeing Corporation.

CEEK VR 
In 2015, Spio founded the CEEK Virtual Reality platform, which currently runs as a streaming service for virtual events which enables live events and helps content creators to reach their fans and users through virtual means including virtual reality headsets, gaming consoles, mobile phones, tablets, desktops, laptops and Smart TVs. The CEEK VR platform was expanded into the CEEK VR App and the CEEK website.

Author 
Spio is also a writer and is the author of It's Not Rocket Science: 7 Game-Changing Traits for Uncommon Success, a self-help book published in 2015, and A Song for Carmine, a love-romance novel. She has also contributed to Chicken Soup for the Soul in the past.

References

External links

Living people
Alumni of Holy Child High School, Ghana
Georgia Tech alumni
Syracuse University alumni
Ghanaian women engineers
21st-century Ghanaian women writers
Ghanaian inventors
Ghanaian innovators
Year of birth missing (living people)